Passalus spiniger is a beetle of the family Passalidae.

References 

Passalidae